Nurus is a genus of beetles in the family Carabidae, containing the following species:

 Nurus atlas (Castelnau, 1867)
 Nurus brevis Motschulsky, 1866
 Nurus curtus (Chaudoir, 1865)
 Nurus fortis (Sloane, 1890)
 Nurus grandis (Sloane, 1910)
 Nurus imperialis (Sloane, 1895)
 Nurus latipennis (Sloane, 1903)
 Nurus medius Darlington, 1961
 Nurus niger Chaudoir, 1878
 Nurus nox Darlington, 1961
 Nurus rex Darlington, 1961

References

Pterostichinae